Fernando Rojas may refer to:

 Fernando Rojas (basketball) (born 1923), Mexican basketball player
 Fernando Rojas (producer) (born 1968), Colombian-American producer, composer, writer, and pianist
 Fernando de Rojas (c. 1465/73–1541), Spanish author and dramatist